Eucereon pometina is a moth of the subfamily Arctiinae. It was described by Herbert Druce in 1894. It is found in Panama.

References

 

pometina
Moths described in 1894